Wafaa Abed Al Razzaq is an Iraqi poet and writer. She was born in 1952 in Basra, Iraq. She currently resides in London, UK, and holds a bachelor's degree in accounting.

Awards
Mitropolite Nicholaous No'man Prize of Human Virtues, for the script entitled From the War Child's Diary – 2008
The Golden Anka’a Medal of literary Creation – The International Golden Anka’a Festival – 2008

Contributions
Wafaa Abed Al Razzaq has participated in a number of poetry festivals and in the foundation of:
The White Palm Tree Gallery – Iraq
The White Palm Tree House for custody and re-qualifying street children in Iraq

Memberships
Ambassador of Iraqi Orphan Children in Iraq – London
Supervisor for broad follow-up - International Golden Al–Anqa’a Touring Festival
Foundation member at the Hope messenger Association - London
 Iraqi Writers Union – Iraq
Exiled Writers Ink – London, UK
Poets Around the World Movement – Chile
Iraqi Association, member of the administration committee, head of the cultural committee – auditor of Iraqi association newspaper (AL Muntada) – London, UK
Arabic Union for Internet Writers
Syrian Story Friends Association – Syria
Poetas del Mundo
In addition to many other associations and organizations

Publications
 Seven poetry books in traditional Arabic language, published between 1999 and 2008, in Lebanon, Jordan and Iraq.
Seven poetry books in Iraqi spoken language published between 1996 and 1999, in Abu Dhabi and Jordan.
 Six poetry CD's in Iraqi spoken language – poetry reading accompanied by music
Two short story books, published in 2000, Al-Kindi editor, Jordan
Three novels published between 2000 and 2001, Al-Kindi editor, Jordan
One poetic novel published in 2001, Al-Kindi editor, Jordan

Translation
From the War Child's Diary, translated from Arabic to French by Hédia DRIDI, co-revised by Josyane De Jesus-Bergey and Mohamed Rafrafi and published by L'Harmattan Edition, Paris, December 2008, with the title: .

Currently under publication
From the War Child's Diary: a poetry book that carries a message against war and calls for world peace. The book is currently under production for an 80-minute film against war.
Wafaa Abed Al Razzaq has been published in several Arabic-language magazines and newspapers
Some of her poems have been translated into English, French, Italian, Spanish, Turkish and Persian.

See also
 Iraqi art
Amal Al Zahawi

References

1952 births
Living people
People from Basra
Iraqi emigrants to the United Kingdom
20th-century Iraqi poets
Iraqi women poets
20th-century Iraqi writers
20th-century Iraqi women writers
21st-century Iraqi poets